Fisherville is a neighborhood of Louisville, Kentucky, United States, which is centered along Taylorsville Road and Finchville Road. It was originally named Curreys after Edward Currey, who opened a post office in 1833. In 1847, it was renamed after Robert Fisher who had died two years earlier and operated a mill on Floyds Fork with his father, John. The area became more commercial in the late 19th and early 20th centuries due to the opening of railroad tracks and the discovery of a mineral water well. Visitors came for the therapeutic value of the mineral water, but when the well went dry in 1914 the area began its reversion to being a primarily residential area. Fisherville is also home of one of Louisville's great Basketball coaches, Denny Crum, who coached for the University of Louisville for 30 years attaining 2 Men's Basketball Championships.

References

Further reading

External links
Fisherville, KY - Our Piece of Pie! 
Fisherville Area Neighborhood Association (FANA)
"Fisherville: Mineral Springs Had Town Awash in Trappings of Luxury at the Turn of the Century" — Article by Keith L. Runyon of The Courier-Journal

Neighborhoods in Louisville, Kentucky